Barksdale is a small unincorporated community and census-designated place (CDP) in the hill country section of the U.S. state of Texas. It is located in Edwards County. In 1990 Barksdale had 617 inhabitants and six businesses. By 2000 the population grew to 1,081 with sixteen businesses. It was first listed as a CDP in the 2020 census with a population of 91.

The Nueces Canyon Consolidated Independent School District serves area students.

References

Unincorporated communities in Edwards County, Texas
Unincorporated communities in Texas
Census-designated places in Texas